Catalpa ovata, the yellow catalpa or Chinese catalpa, is a pod-bearing tree native to China. They bloom in July and August. The leaves are very similar in shape to those of Paulownia tomentosa, having three lobes (two are abruptly truncated on either edge, with a third, central, slightly acute, pointed lobe forming the leaf apex), and are darkly green. Fruits are very narrow, foot-long pods.

Although native to the more temperate provinces within China (Anhui, Gansu, Hebei, Heilongjiang, Henan, Hubei, Jiangsu, Jilin, Liaoning, Nei Monggol, Ningxia, Qinghai, Shaanxi, Shandong, Shanxi, Sichuan, Xinjiang), C. ovata is also cultivated in North America and Europe, and has become a parent of Catalpa × erubescens with the American species Catalpa bignonioides. It is commonly used to make the undersides of qin.

Gallery

Chemistry
The plant contains dehydro-alpha-lapachone (DAL) which inhibits vessel regeneration, interferes with vessel anastomosis, and limits plexus formation in zebrafish. DAL also controlled the development of the fungi rice blast, tomato late blight, wheat leaf rust, barley powdery mildew and red pepper anthracnose (Colletotrichum coccodes (Wallr) S Hughes). The chemical was particularly effective in suppressing anthracnose.

Other
Referenced in the Zhuangzi.

References

External links

ovata
Trees of China
Flora of Xinjiang
Plants described in 1837
Garden plants of Asia
Ornamental trees
Endemic flora of China